Paul C. Stahr (1883–1953) was an American illustrator who created many posters, book and magazine covers, particularly for Pulps. Stahr illustrated numerous covers for Argosy magazine from 1923 to 1936.

Stahr was longtime resident of Long Beach, New York.

References

External links
Paul Stahr at American Art Archives
 
 

1883 births
American illustrators
American poster artists
1953 deaths